Géo Ham, Georges Hamel (18 September 1900 in Laval, Mayenne, France – June 1972 in Paris) was a French painter and illustrator.

He is known for his illustrations of aeroplanes or automobiles which appeared in L'Illustration.

In 1918, he was received at the École nationale supérieure des arts décoratifs.

He was appointed as an Official Peintre de l'Air in 1931.

Works

Jacques Mortane, ill. Géo Ham: Large aircraft raids, Ed. Mame, 1936
Roland Tessier, Illustrations by Géo Ham: Henri Guillaumet, Éditions Flammarion, 1947

External links
Friends of Géo Ham
experiencelemans.com

1900 births
1972 deaths
French illustrators
20th-century French painters
20th-century French male artists
French male painters
People from Laval, Mayenne
Official Painter of the French Air Force